Wild Cove is a small community on the north island of Twillingate, Newfoundland and Labrador. South of Wild Cove is Twillingate and north is Crow Head and the famous Long Point Lighthouse. Wild Cove is part of the Town of Twillingate.

Populated places in Newfoundland and Labrador